= Revolution Express Train =

Vietnamese Steam Train

The Revolution Express is a new heritage railway project in Vietnam, set to begin operations in 2026. The company has restored two 1960's Mikado 141 steam locomotives, and is set to operate between Da Nang, Vietnam, and Hue, Vietnam, over the Hai Van Pass and through Lang Co. The Revolution Express is the only private rail operator in Vietnam.

== Management ==
On 20 May 2024, Revolution Express, trading under the name Indochina Rail Joint Stock Company, and represented by its Chairman, Mr Michael Gebbie, signed a management agreement with Wafaifo Optimisers.
